The Transit of Venus is a 1980 novel written by Australian author Shirley Hazzard. It won the 1980 National Book Critics Circle Award.

Overview 
Two orphaned Australian sisters, Caroline and Grace Bell emigrate to England in the 1950s. A young astonomer, Ted Tice, falls in love with Caroline, and the next thirty years of his life are dedicated to his pursuit of her, however Caroline prefers the unscrupulous Paul Ivory, a playwright. Meanwhile Grace settles into marriage with an officious beurocrat Christian Thrale.

The Sydney Review of Books wrote of the novel:

References 

General references

1980 Australian novels
Novels set in Sydney
PEN/Faulkner Award for Fiction-winning works
National Book Critics Circle Award-winning works